Smart on Crime: A Career Prosecutor's Plan to Make Us Safer  is a book by Kamala Harris with Joan O'C Hamilton, first published by Chronicle Books on October 7, 2009.

Contents
First published as Harris (then the San Francisco district attorney) was beginning her 2010 campaign for California Attorney General, the book outlines her vision of how the criminal justice system should function. She explains in detail why it is not enough to simply be tough on crime, and how prosecutors and lawmakers must also be smart and reform-minded in their approach. She argues such changes would increase public safety, reduce costs, and strengthen communities.

Reception
Children's Defense Fund president Marian Wright Edelman praised the book saying "Harris speaks from experience to debunk myths and offer real solutions to many of the problems with [our] current criminal justice system. Her suggestions have the potential to change and save lives."

In view of the murder of George Floyd by a police officer and subsequent protests, some critics have observed that Harris did not pay enough attention to race, instead attributing the problem of disparities in the system to class, and mentioning racial profiling from law enforcement only twice. In one passage, she dispels the notion that communities of color are inherently hostile towards the police saying, "There is a widely held notion that poor communities, particularly poor African-American and Latino communities, consider law enforcement the enemy and that they do not want police officers in their neighborhoods. In fact, the opposite is true. Both my experience and scientific surveys reflect this fact again and again. I can state categorically that economically poor people want and support law enforcement."

In response, Harris has stated that she is well aware of the racial biases in criminal justice and policing, citing her decision to become a prosecutor as an extension of the work her parents did during the civil rights movement. Those same critics have also noted that since being elected to the U.S. Senate in 2016 and as Vice President in 2020, Harris has become more assertive on issues such as prison reform, racial equality, and scrutinizing police practices.

References

External links
Book on the Internet Archive (free registration required)

2009 non-fiction books
American political books
Books by Kamala Harris
English-language books
Race-related controversies in literature